Yann Pennequin-Le Bras (born 10 January 1994) is a footballer who plays as a midfielder for Vénus. Born in France, he is a Tahiti international.

Career

In 2017, he signed for Tahitian side Vénus, helping them win the league.

References

External links
 

1994 births
Association football midfielders
French footballers
Living people
Tahiti international footballers
French Polynesian footballers